Doveville is an unincorporated community in Fairfax County, in the U.S. state of Virginia. It lies along Virginia State Highway 236, west of Annandale, east of the independent city of Fairfax and southwest of Merrifield. Immediately to the south is Rutherford and immediately to the north is Mantua.  Numerous parks are located nearby, including Long Branch Stream Valley Park to the south, Daniels Run Park to the west and Woodburn Road Park and Accotink Stream Valley Park to the northeast.

Notable landmarks
To the east lies Northern Virginia Community College Annandale Campus. Churches of note include Highview Christian Fellowship, Providence Presbyterian Church, Barcroft Bible Church, Fairfax Seventh-Day Adventist and Bethlehem Lutheran Church. The Jewish Community Centre of Northern Virginia also lies in the northeastern part of Doveville. It also contains the Wilbert Tucker Woodson High School, the largest building in the community.

References

Unincorporated communities in Virginia
Unincorporated communities in Fairfax County, Virginia
Washington metropolitan area